Birch Lake in Ontario, Canada may refer to one of nineteen lakes of that name:

Birch Lake in Algoma District, NTS map sheet 041J12
Birch Lake in Algoma District, NTS map sheet 041J06
Birch Lake in Algoma District, NTS map sheet 041J12
Birch Lake in Cochrane District, NTS map sheet 042A07
Birch Lake in Frontenac County, NTS map sheet 031C10
Birch Lake in Kenora District, NTS map sheet 052N08
Birch Lake in Kenora District, NTS map sheet 052E10
Birch Lake in Kenora District, NTS map sheet 052E16
Birch Lake in Nipissing District, NTS map sheet 041P01
Birch Lake in Parry Sound District, NTS map sheet 041H09
Birch Lake in Rainy River District, NTS map sheet 052B03
Birch Lake in Sudbury District, NTS map sheet 041P03
Birch Lake in Sudbury District, NTS map sheet 042B02

See also
List of lakes in Ontario

References

Search at the Geographical Names Board of Canada Geonames Query web site with parameters "Name : Birch Lake* Feature type : LAKE Province/Territory : ON". Retrieved 2010-08-25.

Lakes of Ontario